Giuliano Pavanello (born 29 November 1961) is an Italian former professional racing cyclist. He rode in the 1985 Tour de France.

References

External links
 

1961 births
Living people
Italian male cyclists
Cyclists from the Metropolitan City of Venice